Maypearl Independent School District is a public school district based in Maypearl, Texas (USA).

Schools
Maypearl High School (Grades 9–12)
Maypearl Middle School (Grades 7–8)
Maypearl Intermediate School (Grades 5–6)
Lorene Smith Kirkpatrick Elementary (Grades PK–4)

In 2017, Maypearl ISD reports having 1,175 students on four campuses.  Maypearl ISD has three schools, LSK Elementary School, Maypearl Middle School (Intermediate campus and Junior High campus) and Maypearl High School.  The district is a highly sought after school district and has many out of district transfer students coming from surrounding school districts.  The district began a digital one to one initiative in 2017 at Maypearl High School and plans to grow this initiative over the coming years.  The district has an indoor golf facility, turf football field and state of the art Agriculture facility with future farm plans.

References

External links
 

School districts in Ellis County, Texas
School districts in Hill County, Texas